Lithium metaborate is a chemical compound of lithium, boron, and oxygen with elemental formula .  It is often encountered as a hydrate, where n is usually 2 or 4.  However, these formulas do not describe the actual structure of the solids.

Lithium metaborate is one of the borates, a large family of salts (ionic compounds) with anions consisting of boron, oxygen, and hydrogen.

Structure

Lithium metaborate has several crystal forms.

The γ form is stable at 15 kbar and 950 °C. It has a polymeric cation consisting of a tridimensional regular array of  tetrahedra sharing oxygen vertices, alernating with lithium cations, each also surrounded by four oxygen atoms. The B-O distances are 148.3 pm, the Li-O distances are 196 pm.

Applications

Laboratory

Molten lithium metaborate, often mixed with lithium tetraborate , is used to dissolve oxide samples for analysis by XRF, AAS, ICP-OES, ICP-AES, and ICP-MS, modern versions of classical bead test. The process may be used also to facilitate the dissolution of oxides in acids for wet analysis. Small amounts of lithium bromide]  or lithium iodide  may be added as mold and crucible release agents.

Lithium tetraborate, on the other hand, dissolves basic oxides with x > y, such as CaO, MgO and other oxides of the alkali metals and alkaline earth metals. Most oxides are best dissolved in a mixture of the two lithium borate salts, for spectrochemical analysis.

References 

Borates
Lithium salts